Yaramala Srinivasa Reddy is an Indian actor, producer and director who works in Telugu cinema. He is born in Khammam, Andhra Pradesh, now Telangana, India. He made his debut as an actor in the film Ishtam (2001). He played significant roles in Idiot, Venky and Darling. He also played the lead role in Geethanjali (2014). He turned as director for Bhagyanagara Veedullo Gamattu (2019).

Filmography

Television

References

Telugu comedians
Male actors in Telugu cinema
Indian male film actors
Living people
Male actors from Telangana
21st-century Indian male actors
People from Khammam
1973 births
Telugu male actors
Indian comedians